Walker Township is an inactive township in Moniteau County, in the U.S. state of Missouri.

Walker Township was established in 1845, and most likely was named after a pioneer citizen.

The township included the city of California.

References

Townships in Missouri
Townships in Moniteau County, Missouri
Jefferson City metropolitan area